Dassu is an administrative unit, known as Union council of Kohistan District in the Khyber Pakhtunkhwa province of Pakistan.

District Kohistan has 4 Tehsils i.e. Dassu, Pattan, Palas and Kandia. Each Tehsil comprises a certain number of Union councils. There are 38 Union councils in district Kohistan.

See also 

 Kohistan District, Pakistan

External links
Khyber-Pakhtunkhwa Government website section on Lower Dir
United Nations
 HAJJ website Uploads
 PBS paiman.jsi.com 

Upper Kohistan District
Union councils of Khyber Pakhtunkhwa
Union Councils of Kohistan District, Pakistan